This list of NFL drafts provides a comprehensive accounting of all of the annual player selection meetings that have been held by the National Football League (NFL). The National Football League draft has taken place prior to every season since .

List of drafts by year

Notes

See also
 Drafts in sports
 List of professional American football drafts
 List of NFL Draft broadcasters
 List of NFL Draft first overall picks
 List of final selections of NFL drafts

References

External links
 

National Football League Draft